This article lists notable classical harpists by type of harp in an alphabetical order.

A
 Nancy Allen

C
 Alice Chalifoux
 Pearl Chertok
 Elaine Christy

D
Mildred Dilling

E
 Osian Ellis

F
 Vincent Fanelli

G
 Sidonie Goossens
 Marcel Grandjany

H
 Alphonse Hasselmans

J
 Pierre Jamet

K
 Yolanda Kondonassis
 Johann Baptist Krumpholtz

L
 Lucile Lawrence
 Heidi Lehwalder

M
 Susann McDonald

N
 François Joseph Naderman
 Jean Henri Naderman

P
 Şirin Pancaroğlu
 Laura Peperara
 Edna Phillips
 Ann Hobson Pilot

R
 Anna-Maria Ravnopolska-Dean also Irish and Paraguayan harp.
 Casper Reardon
 Henriette Renié
 Marisa Robles

S
 Victor Salvi
 Carlos Salzedo

T
 Marcel Tournier

W
 Sylvia Woods
 Aristid von Würtzler

Z
 Nicanor Zabaleta

See also
List of harpists

Harpists, classical
Harpists